Anju Jason (born November 21, 1987) became the first Marshallese sportsperson in history to qualify for the Olympics in 2008.   He competes in taekwondo.  He took 27th place and received no official recognition. Jason, who was born in the Marshall Islands, moved to Hawaii at the age of six. He now lives in Yakima, Washington.

References
News article on Anju Jason's qualification for the Olympic Games
Anju Jason's profile at Yahoo! Sports
He currently works at Panda express

See also
 Marshall Islands at the 2008 Summer Olympics

External links
 

1987 births
Living people
Marshallese male taekwondo practitioners
Olympic taekwondo practitioners of the Marshall Islands
Taekwondo practitioners at the 2008 Summer Olympics
Marshallese emigrants to the United States
People from Yakima, Washington